The Fulford–Miami Speedway was a AAA Championship Car wood race track located in North Miami Beach, Florida. It was the first speedway built in South Florida. The  track was built in 1925 by Indianapolis Motor Speedway co-founder Carl Fisher, who was also developing the city. To help build the track, Fisher hired 1911 Indianapolis 500 winner Ray Harroun, who also served as general manager of the track. In comparison, the Daytona International Speedway's banking is 32°. Because of the speed the track's configuration produced, the track was considered as the fastest in the world.

The track held only one event, the Carl G. Fisher Trophy in the 1926 AAA Championship Car season. The race's official starter was Barney Oldfield. Out of the 19 cars competing, only six finished the race. On September 17, 1926, the track was destroyed by the Great Miami Hurricane; the lumber that comprised the track's surface was scattered across the neighborhood, and was later, after being recovered, used by the city for reconstruction. After its destruction, the area was taken over by the Presidential County Club. South Florida did not have a major auto race again until 1983, when the Grand Prix of Miami was held on a street circuit in downtown Miami. Two years later, open wheel racing returned when CART used a street course at Tamiami Park for their season finale, the Beatrice Indy Challenge.

References

External links
 1926 Carl G. Fisher Trophy results at ChampCarStats

Motorsport venues in Florida
Defunct motorsport venues in the United States
Event venues established in 1926
Sports venues in Miami
North Miami Beach, Florida
1926 establishments in Florida
1926 disestablishments in Florida